The German submarine U-109 was a Type IXB U-boat of Nazi Germany's Kriegsmarine that operated during World War II. She conducted nine war-patrols, sinking 12 ships and damaging one. All but one of these were during the six patrols she carried out under the command of Heinrich Bleichrodt.

On 4 May 1943, she was sunk with all hands by a B-24 Liberator, operated by 86 Squadron RAF.

Construction and design

Construction

U-109 was ordered by the Kriegsmarine on 24 May 1938 (as part of Plan Z and in violation of the Treaty of Versailles). Her keel was laid down on 9 March 1940 by DeSchiMAG AG Weser, Bremen as yard number 972. U-109 was launched on 14 September 1940 and commissioned on 5 December under the command of Hans-Georg Fischer.

Design
German Type IXB submarines were slightly larger than the original German Type IX submarines, later designated IXA. U-109 had a displacement of  when at the surface and  while submerged. She had two shafts and two  propellers.

U-109 was fitted with six  torpedo tubes (four fitted at the bow and two at the stern), 22 torpedoes, one  SK C/32 naval gun, 180 rounds, and a  SK C/30 as well as a  C/30 anti-aircraft gun. The boat had a complement of forty-eight.

Service history

Training 
U-109 was commissioned on 5 December 1940 in Bremen. The U-boat was allocated to the 2nd U-boat Flotilla in Kiel, and from 20 December on in Danzig. On 1 March the boat participated in the tactical exercises where convoy attackes where simulated. The performance of the commandant K.Kapt Hans-Georg Fischer was graded as insufficient and the U-boat had to do the tactical exercise once more. U-109 was transferred to front-line service, still as a member of the 2. Unterseebootsflottille on 1 May.

First patrol
U-109 left Kiel on 6 May. For 24 days, she roamed the North Sea and eventually the North Atlantic in search of Allied convoys heading to Britain. 

On 13 May she was assigned to group West in the area SSE of Cape Farewell, Groenland.  A first attack was made on 15 May but moments before launching torpedoes it was noted that the attacked ship is a neutral, and the attack was aborted. 

The next day she found the convoy but was driven aff by an escort and was attacked with depth charges. U-109 lost contact with the convoy but can sink a straggler. Many older sources mention the ship sunk by U-109 as being the British steamship Marconi but more recent sources conclude it is the British steam merchantman Harpagus. The convoy escorts counterattacked and U-109 received damage from depth charges and must abort to France.

During the retreat to France U-109 tried to intercept some of the ships chasing the battleship BIsmarck that tried also to escape to France after being damaged in the battle denmark strait but the U-109 did not find any.

When the boat was close to the French coast, a periscope was sighted but no warning was given to other boats.

On 29 May U-109 entered the German occupied port of Lorient in France. This city was to remain her home base for the remainder of her career.

The first and second watch officer Keller and Schartzkopff ( who later became U-boat commanders themselves ) complained about the performance of their commander and as a result, K.Kapt Hans-Georg Fischer was replaced by Kptlt. Heinrich Bleichrodt.

Second patrol 
Her second voyage began on 28 June 1941 when she left her home port of Lorient. The orders were to attack shipping around Freetown, Africa together with 3 other boats. For such a long range mission, a resuply stop was foreseen by the german tanker Corrientes, which was interned in the harbour on the Spanish Canaries. But due to British pressure, the Spanish authorities forbade the resupplying of U-boats in those islands, and the mission to Freetown had to be cancelled.  Instead U-109 patrols West of the Canaries.

On 6 July the U-109 started to chase a fast ship, the City of Auckland. Only the next day she can attack but 4 subsequent torpedo shots missed the ship. After the failed torpedo attacks, the U-109 attacked the ship with the deck gun, but the City of Auckland laid a smokescreen, returned fire and can escape.

In the night of 21 to 22 July the U-109 slipped into the harbour of Cadiz, Spain to refuel from the tanker Thalia. After refuelling she joined the patrol line Süd, which is heading back to the Spanish Canaries. On 30 July the boat was ordered to steer towards the Gibraltar area, in order to be ready to intercept the next HG convoy. When German agents detected convoy HG-70 left Girbralter on 9 August, U-109 joined the hunt for the convoy, but could not make contact with it. She received some depth charge damage escorts and in the night of 13 August she had to break off the operation and return to base. U-109 arrived in Lorient on 17 August.

Third patrol 
After leaving Lorient on 21 September, many problems were discovered during the first deep dive test, and U-109 had to abort her patrol and return to Lorient. She was back the next day.

A second attempt was made on 5 October 1941, she proceeded to the South-East of Greenland, to form the nucleus of group Mordbrenner together with 3 other boats. More boats were to join soon, but one of them, the  discovered convoy SC-48 and hence these boats were diverted to attack this convoy. U-109 did not participate in the attack on the convoy but instead was sent more North-West towards the Belle Isle strait. Special permission from Hitler was needed for this move, as at this stage of the war, policy was to avoid conflict with America and respect the neutrality zone. No convoys nor ships were found, since based on 'ULTRA' decrypts, the British are able to rerout the convoys around U-boat positions. 

At the end of October, the Reisswolf group had found and attacked convoy ON-28, but had achieved not much, 2 of the Reisswolf boats shadowed the convoy and tries to bring up the Mordbrenner boats. In the morning of 1 November U-109 sights 2 escorts and on midday botches an attack on to big ships. U-109 chases the convoy until the Cabot strait but cannot attack. 

On 2 November the U-boat is released from group Mordbrenner and can operate independently. The U-109 steers South but on 5 November is assigned to escort the blockade runner Silvaplana ( a prize ship of the raider Atlantis ) back to France. 

U-109 arrived in Lorient on 18 November after spending 45 days at sea and without sinking any vessels.

Fourth patrol
The U-boat left Lorient on 27 December 1941 and she travelled to the eastern seaboard of the United States in search of Allied shipping as part of Operation Paukenschlag (Drumbeat). Initially she was allocated to the area before the coast of Nova Scotia, between Halifax and New York. Whilst the other boats of the group enjoyed succes after the start of the operation on 13 January 1942, the U-109 had to wait till 19 January before she sighted her first ship. But the U-109 missed the ship five times and the attack is broken off when the ship reaches Cape Sable. The next day a fast ship is missed with one torpedo. She sank her first enemy vessel, the British merchant vessel Thirlby on 23 January. Two days later an attack on a ship must be broken off when two escorts show up. Then Bleichrodt decides to leave the empty shipping lanes before Canada and heads for New York. When preparing the fuel transfer on 31 January, the British vessel, Tacoma Star is sighted. U-109 gives chase and sinks the vessel the next day. Due to bad weather and navigational errors a new rendezvous with U-130 is delayed until 4 February, when once more a vessel is sighted and chased. U-109 sinks the Canadian tanker Montrolite on 5 February and then sights Panamanian Halcyon on 6 February. An attack with the last two torpedoes fails and the ship is sunk with the deck guns. The fuel transfer is finally executed on 6 February and U-109 can return to France. U-109 returned to Lorient on 23 February 1942, she was reported by the BBC to be sunk and the crew taken prisoner.

During her first attack on 19 January, a ship the Empire Kingfisher sent out distress signals of being torpedoed. Since the U-109 was the only boat in the direct vicinity of the Empire Kingfisher the U-109 was credited with its sinking. However, the Empire Kingfisher had struck an uncharted rock and had mistaken the shock of the collision for a torpedo impact.

Fifth patrol
Her fifth patrol was also eventful. Having left Lorient on 25 March 1942, the U-boat headed to the southern coast of the United States. On 20 April, she sank the British merchant vessel Harpagon. This was followed by the damaging of the British ship La Paz off the coast of Florida on 1 May. Two days later, on 3 May, U-109 torpedoed and sank the Dutch vessel Laertes. She returned to Lorient on 3 June 1942, after 72 days at sea.

Sixth patrol
Much like her second patrol, U-109s sixth foray took place off the coast of Africa. For 81 days, she traveled as far south as the Gold Coast and sank five enemy vessels: the Norwegian Arthur W. Sewall on 7 August; and a further four British vessels, Vimeira on 11 August, Ocean Might on 3 September, Tuscan Star on 6 September and Peterton on 17 September. U-109 then returned to Lorient on 6 October 1942.

Seventh patrol
The U-109 left Lorient on 28 November 1942 and traveled south off the northern coast of South America. On its way the U-boat attacked a naval force but suffered a heavy depth charge counterattack. Before Trinidad on 26 December, the boat suffered again a depth charge counterattack from a lone ship she had attacked and as a result Bleichrodt suffered a nervous breakdown. Finally on 30 December the first watch officer had to take over and he brought the U-boat back home. U-109 rendezvoused with U-558 which transferred a backup officer to her. 

On 23 January 1943, she returned to Lorient without any victories. Bleichrodt was transferred to hospital and left the U-109.

Eighth patrol 
The submarine left port on 3 March and travelled as far south as the Azores, circled the island chain and returned to Lorient on 1 April after 30 days at sea and without sighting any enemy vessels.

Loss
U-109s ninth and last war patrol took place from 28 April 1943, when she left Lorient, on 4 May. She was sunk by four depth charges from a RAF Liberator aircraft (89 Squadron) south of Ireland. The aircraft was flying to a rendezvous with an Allied convoy when it detected the boat with its H2S radar, north-east of the Azores. The U-boat was seen to surface before slowly sinking, apparently with enough time for the crew to abandon her, although none were seen to emerge from her hatches. It is assumed that all 52 of her crew went down with her.

Wolfpacks
U-109 took part in four wolfpacks, namely:
 West (13 – 23 May 1941) 
 Süd (22 July - 5 August 1941) 
 Mordbrenner (16 October - 3 November 1941) 
 Wohlgemut (12 – 18 March 1943)

Summary of raiding history

References

Bibliography

External links

German Type IX submarines
U-boats commissioned in 1940
U-boats sunk in 1943
U-boats sunk by British aircraft
World War II submarines of Germany
World War II shipwrecks in the Atlantic Ocean
1940 ships
Ships built in Bremen (state)
U-boats sunk by depth charges
Ships lost with all hands
Maritime incidents in May 1943